The 2023 Carlton Football Club season will be the Carlton Football Club's 160th season of competition.

It will the club's men's team's 127th season as a member of the Australian Football League, and the second under senior coach Michael Voss; and it will be the club's women's team's eighth season contesting the AFL Women's. The club will also field its men's reserves team in the Victorian Football League and its state level women's team in the VFL Women's.

Club summary
The 2023 AFL season will be the 127th season of the VFL/AFL competition since its inception in 1897; and, having competed in every season, it will also be the 127th season contested by the Carlton Football Club. The club will also field its women's team in the eighth season of the AFL Women's competition, its men's reserves team in its sixth Victorian Football League season, and its women's reserves team in its fifth VFL Women's season.

Squad for 2023
The following is Carlton's squad for the 2023 season.

Statistics are correct as of end of 2022 season.

For players: (c) denotes captain, (vc) denotes vice-captain.
For coaches: (s) denotes senior coach, (cs) denotes caretaker senior coach, (a) denotes assistant coach, (d) denotes development coach, (m) denotes managerial or administrative role in a football or coaching department

Playing list changes
The following summarises all player changes which occurred after the 2022 season. Unless otherwise noted, draft picks refer to selections in the 2022 National Draft.

In

Out

List management

Season summary

Pre-season
Carlton will play two practice matches, the first deemed unofficial and the second deemed official, as part of its lead-up to the premiership season.

Individual awards
Honorific teams
22under22 team of the decade – three Carlton players – Patrick Cripps, Charlie Curnow and Sam Docherty – were named in the 22under22 team of the decade. The honorific team was announced in March 2023, and represented the ten 22under22 teams between 2013 and 2022.

AFLCA awards
Assistant coach Tim Clarke won the AFLCA Phil Walsh Memorial Scholarship.

Hall of Fame

AFL Women's
After failing to play finals in both 2022 AFLW seasons, the club conducted an independent review of its AFLW program, which ran between December 2022 and January 2023. Among the review's conclusions was the need for a full time senior coach to improve leadership across the program, and a recognition that there had been confusion among the players regarding the club's onfield game plan – two conclusions which resulted in the club terminating part-time senior coach Daniel Harford, who had coached the team for five seasons. The review also identified a need for an increased professional and high-performance culture, and improved 360° feedback and development.

Squad
The club's AFL Women's season seven squad (from 2022) is given below. The player transfers period ahead of the 2023 season is yet to occur.

Reserves
Carlton will field reserves teams in the men's and women's competitions during the 2023 season.

Men's
Carlton's men's reserves team will contest its sifth VFL season; and its 86th overall season of reserves and state level competition dating back to 1919.

Club Head of Development Luke Power will take over as the reserves coach after 2021–22 coach Daniel O'Keefe departed.

Women's
The club will field a team in the VFL Women's competition for the fifth time.

References

Carlton Football Club seasons
Carlton
Carlton